Hyung-Joon Son born 13 January 1995, is an Australian professional footballer who plays as a midfielder for Eastern Suburbs.

References

External links

1995 births
Living people
South Korean footballers
Association football defenders
Gyeongnam FC players
National Premier Leagues players
Sportspeople from Ulsan